Inosine triphosphate (ITP) is an intermediate in the purine metabolism pathway, seen in the synthesis of ATP and GTP. It comprises an inosine nucleotide containing three phosphate groups esterified to the sugar moiety.

ITP results from deamination of ATP. Incorporation of ITP into the DNA from the nucleotide pool can lead to DNA damage, mutagenesis and other harmful effects. ITP is processed by the enzyme inosine triphosphate pyrophosphatase (ITPA), which turns it into inosine monophosphate (IMP), to avoid incorporation into DNA.

References 

Nucleotides
Phosphate esters